is a civil parish in the municipality of Castro Daire, Portugal. The population in 2011 was 228, in an area of 18.60 km2.

Demographics

References

Freguesias of Castro Daire